Doctor Who is a pinball machine designed by Bill Pfutzenreuter (Pfutz) and Barry Oursler, and released by Midway (under the Bally brand name) in September 1992. It is based on the television series Doctor Who. As stated in the Gameplay section, the rulesheet is rather different from other pinball machines released at the time, which didn't help popularity (and even now it is still seen as an exotic machine amongst collectors) as casual players did not understand the complex rule changes that occur during the game.

The first 100 games included a moving Dalek topper that would turn side-to-side while the robot was speaking. The effect was achieved by fitting the robot's body with a complex motor, cam, and optoelectronics system. Its complexity and expense led to it being cut from the production run. Production Dalek toppers can be made to move with "wobble head kits".

Prototypes featured the old Bally-style backbox (and a totally different backglass), but this was changed to the Williams-styled one in order to cheapen the production process for both product lines.

Gameplay
The basic gameplay is all about the various incarnations of the Doctor (seven at the time of production). Each Doctor affects the rules or scoring for a different section of the playfield, as described below.
 Doctor 1 (played in the series by William Hartnell): Awards an extra "E-S-C-A-P-E" letter each time the shot is made, thus enabling easier earning of the Video Mode (which can then be used to "collect" the currently selected Doctor).
 Doctor 2 (played in the series by Patrick Troughton): More time to make the combo shot on the left ("Hang-On" target) and additionally doubling the score of the shot.
 Doctor 3 (played in the series by Jon Pertwee): More time to shoot "W-H-O", thus increased chances to score Extra balls.
 Doctor 4 (played in the series by Tom Baker): Easier to achieve "R-E-P-A-I-R".
 Doctor 5 (played in the series by Peter Davison): Doubles Jet Bumper score, which also results in a faster lighting of the Transmat (to "collect" the currently selected Doctor).
 Doctor 6 (played in the series by Colin Baker): Increases the Playfield Multiplier shot (each time the shot is made by one instead of 0.5).
 Doctor 7 (played in the series by Sylvester McCoy): Awards an additional shot every time the up/down target bank (Time Expander) is hit, thus enabling a faster multiball lock.

Areas of Importance

Each of the various playfield zone features relates to one of the individual Doctors as listed below, and also affects gameplay rules. Completing a Doctor's playfield zone does not award that Doctor, but earning that Doctor will make earning the zone's award easier. The individual zones are as follows:

 Doctor 1: Lower right-hand orange target bank, labeled "E-S-C-A-P-E" - When all six of these targets are lit,  the player can shoot the upper left orbit (toward the jet bumpers) to enable video mode. Each successfully completed video mode wave awards the currently lit Doctor, and alters the game's ruleset as described above. Once Doctor 1 is awarded, each hit in this area counts double.
 Doctor 2: Left entrance lane above the upper left flipper. Hang On mode is enabled when the right inlane switch is tripped; a flashing red arrow lights up next to the upper left flipper when it is active. If the left entrance lane is hit before time runs out, the Hang On award doubles.
 Doctor 3: Right ramp, left entrance lane, and upper right loop, in that order. Accomplishing this sequence of shots lights "W-H-O", which can award extra balls after a specific number of completions of the pattern. Using the factory settings, the first extra ball is enabled after 2 W-H-O sequences are completed. When enabled, an inlane or outlane (which can be changed by using the flippers) lights, tripping the lane switch awards an extra ball.
 Doctor 4: Upper left target bank, labeled "R-E-P-A-I-R." Completing all six targets before time runs out enables Unlimited Millions, which causes each successive hit on the target bank to award an ever-increasing number of points. As long as the target bank continues to be hit before time runs out, the award will continue to increase and grow upon itself.
 Doctor 5: The Transmat is enabled after scoring 1,000,000 points on the jet bumpers. If Doctor 5 is already awarded, the jet bumpers will score double their normal value, building the Transmat's charge faster. Once the Transmat is fully charged, the player can hit the target just underneath the upper right loop to Transmat the currently selected Doctor. The rule changes pertaining to that Doctor then remain in effect for the rest of the game.
 Doctor 6: Upper right loop. Successive loops enable a full-playfield multiplier of up to 4X. Without Doctor 6 scored, and using default settings, the game's playfield multiplier advances at 0.5X per loop completed, and the amount of time each step of the multiplier remains active gets shorter until 4X (which is 10 seconds long). With Doctor 6, the playfield multiplier advances by 1 instead of 0.5, again to a maximum of 4X, and the time for each step of the multiplier lengthens. Additionally, every 10th loop enables the Sonic Boom, which reroutes the ball back to the left inlane. The player can then hit the W-H-O shots (right ramp, left entrance lane, upper right loop) in order to earn 10 million per shot.
 Doctor 7: Center target bank and mini-playfield (The Time Expander). Without Doctor 7, each hit on the row of 5 targets on level 2 of the Mini-Playfield lights a single Time Expander Factor (15 of which are needed to start multiball). With Doctor 7 enabled, each hit on these targets counts double. Additionally, if Doctor 7 is collected, hitting the center target while the mini-playfield is on Level 1 will light a Time Expander Factor, and if the player fails to score a jackpot during the first wave of multiball, the center target on level 1 will add more time to the re-lock timer.

Multiball
The Multiball mode in Dr. Who begins after the player lights 15 Time Expander Factors after locking the ball. After the Time Expander reaches 0, the mini-playfield rises again to level 3, which has three gates in it with a small picture of a Dalek on the front. The player must shoot one of the doors to start multiball. Once the player has done this, the mini playfield lowers, releases the two locked balls, and then rises again back to level 3. To earn the jackpot, the player must hit all three gates on level three of the mini-playfield. This awards a jackpot that begins at 5,000,000 points for the lowest tier of Daleks  and grows dramatically as the player rises through the ranks of Daleks (up to the Emperor Dalek at 50,000,000 points). After the player defeats the Emperor Dalek, Davros is revealed as the arch-villain behind the story. The mini-playfield lowers itself back to Level 2, and to defeat Davros, the player must hit the bank of 5 targets once (more if the player has already defeated Davros) to deactivate Davros' shield and get the mini-playfield to raise back to level 3. Once Davros' shield is down, the player must hit the three gates on level 3 again, after which a 100,000,000-point Davros Jackpot is awarded. All jackpots are affected by the playfield multiplier, allowing the player to collect tremendous numbers of points from a single jackpot (1,200,000,000 points if Davros has been defeated twice before and the Playfield Multiplier is 4).

Digital versions
The table was released for The Pinball Arcade on October 1, 2016 and taken down on June 30, 2018 right after WMS license expiration.

 
An updated version, dubbed Master of Time, was announced alongside the original. Originally planned for an October 2016 release, the revised table was released on December 21, 2016. Based on the original Doctor Who pinball machine, the new table focuses on incarnations of the Doctor that debuted after the classic series and instead has the player choose a villain to face rather than an individual Doctor to play as. The table features new voiceover recorded by Peter Capaldi as the Twelfth Doctor, and Michelle Gomez as Missy, as well as using voice clips from past new-series Doctors taken from the show. This updated version is still available for purchase, unlike the original Doctor Who.

References

External links

Background Information on the Making of Doctor Who by Designer Bill Pfutzenreuter
Many high resolution photos

1992 pinball machines
Bally pinball machines
Pinball
Pinball machines based on television series